Emily Barr is a British travel writer and novelist. She debuted with the novel Backpack in 2001. In additional to travel fiction, she has also written young adult novels and a horror.

Career
Barr had been working as a journalist for The Guardian, before embarking on a year-long work trip around the world in the late 1990s, writing a column as she went. The journey inspired her first novel, Backpack, published in 2001 by Headline Publishing Group. The book won the WHSmith New Talent Award in 2002. It was followed by Baggage, Cuban Heels in 2003, and Atlantic Shift in 2004. In 2009, she published The Life You Want, a sequel to Backpack.

In 2014, Barr released a novella, Blackout, for the Quick Reads series. Her first young adult novel, The One Memory of Flora Banks, was published by Penguin Books as an ebook in 2016 and paperback in 2017. It has been translated into 26 languages and has sold over 50,000 copies. Her first horror novel, We Hear Voices, was released in late 2020 only in the US under the pen name Evie Green.

Barr has taught creative writing at the Falmouth University and the Faber Academy, among others.

Private life
Barr has lived in France, and is now based in Falmouth, Cornwall with her husband and their three children. She met her husband in China, while travelling around the world.

Bibliography
 Backpack (2001)
 Baggage (2002)
 Cuban Heels (2003; also known as Cuba)
 Atlantic Shift (2004; also known as Solo)
 Plan B (2006)
 Out of My Depth (2007)
 The Sisterhood (2008)
 The Life You Want (2009)
 The Perfect Lie (2010)
 The First Wife (2011)
 Stranded (2012)
 The Sleeper (2013)
 Blackout (2014)
 The One Memory of Flora Banks (2016)
 The Truth and Lies of Ella Black (2018) 
 The Girl Who Came Out of the Woods (2019)
 We Hear Voices (2020; as Evie Green)
 Things to Do Before the End of the World (2021)
 Ghosted (2022)

References

External links
 
 

1971 births
Living people
Alumni of the Courtauld Institute of Art
British chick lit writers
British women travel writers
British women novelists
British women columnists
21st-century British novelists
21st-century British women writers